Eric Butorac and Scott Lipsky were the defending champions, but Butorac retired from professional tennis in September 2016 and Lipsky chose to compete in Istanbul instead.

Ryan Harrison and Michael Venus won the title, defeating David Marrero and Tommy Robredo in the final, 7–5, 6–2.

Seeds

Draw

Draw

References
 Main Draw

Doubles